Theodor Adrian von Renteln (15 September 1897 – 1946 (disputed)) was an activist and politician in Nazi Germany. During World War II, he was General Commissioner of Generalbezirk Litauen and was involved in perpetrating the Holocaust in Lithuania.

Of Baltic German origin, von Renteln studied law and economics in Berlin and Rostock, but became a journalist. In 1928, he joined the NSDAP and the following year, he became the founder and head of the National Socialist Schoolchildren's League (NSS). In 1931, he was appointed the head of the Hitler Youth, but he gave up leadership of the two organizations upon his election to the Reichstag in 1932.

In 1932–1933 he led the Combat League of the Commercial Middle Class (NS-Kampfbund für den Gewerblichen Mittelstand), an organisation allegedly "Deflecting Jewish Atrocity and Boycott-Mongering", participating in the boycott of Jewish businesses and other forms of persecution. In June 1933, he was appointed President of the National Socialist Council of Industry and Trade (Nationalsozialistische Handwerks-, Handels-, und Gewerbeorganisation or NS-HAGO), holding this position until 1935, when this organisation was merged with the German Labor Front (DAF). Von Renteln became a staff leader of the German Labor Front. In 1940, he was appointed the Reich Leader of the Trade and Artisanship Section of the NSDAP (Hauptamtsleiter Handel und Handwerk in der Reichsleitung der NSDAP). He was also the head of the Supreme Court of the Reich Labor Front.

In July 1941, he was appointed the Generalkommissar of Generalbezirk Litauen (roughly modern Lithuania), where he took harsh measures against the Jewish population. On 26 August 1941 he ordered that all telephones and lines were to be stripped, postal service be cut off, and bridges to the Kaunas (Kovno) Ghetto be surrounded with barbed wire fences to prevent people from jumping off. This order also forbade the Jews of the Kovno ghetto to use doors, window frames, or houses for fuel. In 1943, he was implicated in the clearing of the Vilna Ghetto, deporting 20,000 Jews to concentration or death camps, as well as in plundering.

According to some accounts, after World War II, he was captured by the Russians, tried, and hanged for war crimes in 1946. According to other sources, after the war he lived under a false identity in South America and died there. His death has never been fully confirmed.

References

External links
 

1897 births
1946 deaths
Baltic-German people
Executed German people
Holocaust perpetrators in Lithuania
German untitled nobility
Kovno Ghetto
Members of the Reichstag of the Weimar Republic
Members of the Reichstag of Nazi Germany
Nazi Party politicians
Nazis convicted of war crimes
Nazis executed by the Soviet Union by hanging
People executed for war crimes
People from Dzau District
Russian and Soviet-German people
Vilna Ghetto